Tonga Island is a small (0.15 km2) island in Tasman Bay / Te Tai-o-Aorere, off the northern coast of the South Island of New Zealand. The island has a flourishing fur seal colony, and is surrounded by the Tonga Island Marine Reserve, which was inaugurated in 1993.

The island is accessible by water taxi or kayak and visible from the Abel Tasman Coast Track.

See also

 List of islands of New Zealand
 List of islands
 Desert island

References

External links

Uninhabited islands of New Zealand
Abel Tasman National Park
Islands of the Tasman District
Tasman Bay